Manicaland Development Association (MDA), established in 1981, was a Zimbabwean NGO established to further the socio-economic development of the Manicaland region of Zimbabwe. 

It ran a training centre at Bonda for skills development and transfer.

Context 
Manicaland is a province of Zimbabwe. It has an area of 36,459 km² and a population of approximately 1.6 million. The capital of the province is Mutare.

The programme of the Zimbabwean government in the period immediately after white minority rule included investment in new forms of rural development.

References

External links
University of Iowa Centre for International Finance and Development  Economic Development Grants
Chitsanza Development Association

Manicaland Province